Bad Kitty may refer to:

 Bad Kitty (comics), an American comic book
 Bad Kitty (novel), a 2006 young adult novel by Michele Jaffe
 Bad Kitty (series), a series of American children's books by Nick Bruel